Jéssica Annais de la Peña Camargo (New York, November 13 of 1977) is a Colombian television presenter and journalist.

Biography 
Jéssica Annais de La Peña Camargo was born in New York, and at the age of five she migrated to Barranquilla with her parents Ricardo de la Peña and Cecilia Camargo, and her sister. She completed her academic studies at the Colegio El Buen Consejo in Barranquilla, and graduated in Social Communication and Journalism from the Universidad del Norte, in the same city. Her most notable passions include dancing and singing. Her first casting for presenter she did in second half. At age 20, while in the second semester of her university career, she auditioned to enter a program at her university, but thanks to her excellent record in cameras, she entered the regional channel Telecaribe, where she first presented a variety program called La Noche and the Televista newscast. A year later, she was hired by Noticias RCN as presenter of the weekend editions, work that she alternated for seven months with her university studies and Telecaribe. After that time, she settled completely in Bogotá, where she went to present weekly broadcasts of the newscast. She transferred her career to the Javeriana University so as not to delay her studies in the last semester.

Her career has included:
 Televista News: The Regional News informs viewers of local, and international Caribbean national events,
 RCN News: She was anchorwoman of different editions of the newsreel between 1998 and 2016. In May, Jessica announced that she would travel to the United States to be a news correspondent for the RCN in New York and other cities of the country.
 The Night, by Telecaribe (1997)
 Televista News, by Telecaribe (1997–1998)
 RCN News (1998–present)
 Breakfast (2018–present)

Personal life 
Jessica had a relationship with a singer from Valledupar, Peter Manjarrés, from 2008 to 2010. She was the inspiration for his song, Tragao de tí. Unfortunately, their relationship didn't last long.

In 2010, Jessica started a new relationship with an engineer called Andres Jaramillo. In April, 2017 Jessica married businessman Ernesto Chalela. On September 19, 2017 he announced through Instagram the birth of his first daughter.

References

External links

1977 births
Living people
Colombian journalists
Colombian women journalists
Journalists from New York City
People from Barranquilla
21st-century American journalists